Blackmud Creek is a creek in Edmonton that flows into Whitemud Creek. The creek starts at Saunders Lake East of Nisku and runs northwest into the City, joining Whitemud Creek in the neighbourhood of Twin Brooks.

Blackmud Creek's name is an accurate preservation of its native Cree-language name .

Communities
Edmonton neighbourhoods overlooking Blackmud Creek form north to south include:

Blue Quill Estates
Skyrattler
Keheewin
Bearspaw
Twin Brooks
Blackburne
Richford
Blackmud Creek
Callaghan
Allard

References

See also
Whitemud Creek
Mill Creek Ravine
List of rivers of Alberta

Valleys of Alberta
North Saskatchewan River
Rivers of Alberta
Landforms of Edmonton